The parc naturel régional de la Brenne is an  large regional nature park located in the French department of Indre, France. It was founded December 22, 1982. Of old, La Brenne was a region in the old French provinces of Berry and Touraine, west of Châteauroux and east of Tournon-Saint-Martin. 
The park is cut in two by the river Creuse. Through the southern half flows the river Anglin. Historically, the southern part of the regional park is not really part of La Brenne.  This part is called La petite Brenne. Historically, it was part of the Boischaut region.

Like in all French national and regional parks, there still are people living in the park. The park has 47 communes, of which the capital is Le Blanc.

Communes of La Brenne 
Obterre - Azay-le-Ferron - Paulnay - Saulnay - Lureuil - Néons-sur-Creuse - Tournon-Saint-Martin - Lurais - Preuilly-la-Ville - Pouligny-Saint-Pierre - Fontgombault - Sauzelles - Saint-Aigny - Le Blanc - Douadic - Mérigny - Ingrandes - Concremiers - Mauvières - Saint-Hilaire-sur-Benaize - Bélâbre - Chalais - Lignac - Tilly - Prissac - Sacierges-Saint-Martin - Chazelet - Luzeret - Thenay - Saint-Gaultier - Rivarennes - Chitray - Oulches - Ciron - Ruffec - Rosnay - Saint-Michel-en-Brenne - Mézières-en-Brenne - Sainte-Gemme - Vendœuvres - Migné - Méobecq - Nuret-le-Ferron - Neuillay-les-Bois - Luant - La Pérouille- Martizay

References

Brenne
Geography of Indre
Tourist attractions in Centre-Val de Loire
Tourist attractions in Indre
Protected areas established in 1982
1982 establishments in France
Ramsar sites in Metropolitan France